BF2 may refer to:

 Battlefield 2, a video game developed by Digital Illusions CE (DICE) 
 Star Wars: Battlefront II (2005 video game), a 2005 video game developed by Pandemic Studios
 Star Wars Battlefront II (2017 video game), a 2017 video game developed by EA DICE
 BF2 IAU Minor Planet Center nomenclature for small solar system bodies
 (6008) 1990 BF2  1990 BF2
 (5489) 1992 BF2 a.k.a. 1992 BF2, see 5489 Oberkochen

See also
 BFF (disambiguation)
 BF3 (disambiguation)